Omagh (from  , meaning 'the virgin plain') is the county town of County Tyrone, Northern Ireland. It is situated where the rivers Drumragh and Camowen meet to form the Strule. Northern Ireland's capital city, Belfast, is 68 miles (109.5 km) to the east of Omagh, and Derry is 34 miles (55 km) to the north.

The town had a population of 19,659 at the 2011 Census, and the former district council, which was the largest in County Tyrone, had a population of 51,356. Omagh contains the headquarters of the Western Education and Library Board, and also houses offices for the Department of Agriculture and Rural Development at Sperrin House, the Department for Regional Development and the Northern Ireland Roads Service at the Tyrone County Hall and the Northern Ireland Land & Property Services at Boaz House.

History

The name Omagh is an anglicisation of the Irish name an Óghmaigh (modern Irish an Ómaigh), meaning "the virgin plain". A monastery was apparently established on the site of the town about 792, and a Franciscan friary was founded in 1464. Omagh was founded as a town in 1610. It served as a refuge for fugitives from the east of County Tyrone during the 1641 Rebellion. In 1689, James II arrived at Omagh, en route to Derry. Supporters of William III, Prince of Orange, later burned the town.

In 1768 Omagh replaced Dungannon as the county town of County Tyrone. Omagh acquired railway links to Londonderry with the Londonderry and Enniskillen Railway in 1852, Enniskillen in 1853 and Belfast in 1861. St Lucia Barracks were completed in 1881. In 1899 Tyrone County Hospital was opened. The Government of Northern Ireland made the Great Northern Railway Board close the Omagh – Enniskillen railway line in 1957. In accordance with the Benson Report submitted to the Northern Ireland Government in 1963, the Ulster Transport Authority closed the  – Omagh – Londonderry main line in 1965, leaving Tyrone with no rail service. St Lucia Barracks closed on 1 August 2007.

On 30 December 1942, a Consolidated Catalina Ib of No. 240 Squadron RAF that was operating from RAF Killadeas crashed into the town. The crash killed all eleven occupants, however no one on the ground was killed or injured. The cause of the crash was never ascertained.

Omagh Town Hall, which opened on 29 September 1915, hosted many prominent performers, including the actors Anew McMaster, Micheál Mac Liammóir and Jimmy O'Dea, before it was demolished to make way for the Strule Arts Centre in 1997.

The Troubles

Omagh came into the international focus of the media on 15 August 1998, when the Real Irish Republican Army exploded a car bomb in the town centre. 29 people were killed in the blast – 14 women (including one pregnant with twins), 9 children and 6 men. Hundreds more were injured as a result of the blast.

In April 2011, a car bomb killed police constable Ronan Kerr. A group of former Provisional IRA members calling itself the Irish Republican Army made its first public statement later that month claiming responsibility for the killing.

In February 2023, an off-duty senior police officer was shot and critically injured at a sports complex in the town. Police stated they were focusing on the New IRA.

Geography

Wards
These wards are only those that cover the town.
Camowen (2001 Population – 2,377)
Coolnagard (2001 Population – 2,547)
Dergmoney (2001 Population – 1,930)
Drumragh (2001 Population – 2,481)
Gortrush (2001 Population – 2,786)
Killyclogher (2001 Population – 2,945)
Lisanelly (2001 Population – 2,973)
Strule (2001 Population – 1,780)

Administrative areas 
The central urban area south of River Strule forms the townland of Omagh in the civil parish of Drumragh, the adjacent area north of the river forms the townland of Lisnamllard in the civil parish of Cappagh (Upper Strabane portion).
Both civil parishes comprise also outskirts of Omagh and some surrounding countryside.
Omagh Urban Electoral Division comprises both townlands.

Townlands

The town sprang up within the townland of Omagh, in the parish of Drumragh. Over time, the urban area has spread into the surrounding townlands. They include:

Campsie
Conywarren (an old name for a rabbit warren)
Coolnagard Lower, Coolnagard Upper ( or )
Crevenagh
Culmore
Dergmoney Lower, Dergmoney Upper
Gortin
Gortmore
Killybrack
Killyclogher
Lammy
Lisanelly
Lisnamallard
Lissan
Mullaghmore
Sedennan (possibly )
Strathroy or Straughroy

Weather

Omagh has a history of flooding and suffered major floods in 1909, 1929, 1954, 1969, 1987, 1999 and, most recently, 12 June 2007. Flood-walls have been built to keep the water in the channel (River Strule) and to prevent it from overflowing into the flood plain. Large areas of land, mainly around the meanders, are unsuitable for development and were developed into large, green open areas, walking routes and parks. The Köppen Climate Classification subtype for this climate is "Cfb" (Marine West Coast Climate/Oceanic climate).

Demography
On Census day (27 March 2011) there were 19,659 people living in Omagh, accounting for 1.09% of the NI total. Of these:

 20.85% were aged under 16 years and 13.69% were aged 65 and over;
 51.27% of the usually resident population were female and 48.73% were male;
 71.32% belong to or were brought up in the Catholic Christian faith and 25.36% belong to or were brought up in a 'Protestant and other Christian (including Christian related)'denominations;
 36.97% had an Irish national identity, 33.97% had a Northern Irish national identity and 28.51% indicated that they had a British national identity (respondents could indicate more than one national identity);
 36 years was the average (median) age of the population;
 13.92% had some knowledge of Irish (Gaelic) and 4.30% had some knowledge of Ulster-Scots.

Population change
According to the World Gazetteer, the following reflects the census data for Omagh since 1981:
1981 – 14,627 (Official census)
1991 – 17,280 (Official census)
2000 – 18,031 (Official estimate)
2001 – 19,910 (Official census)
2011 – 19,659 (Official census)

Places of interest

Tourist attractions

The Ulster American Folk Park near Omagh includes the cottage where Thomas Mellon was born in 1813, before emigrating to Pennsylvania, in the United States when he was five. His son Andrew W. Mellon became secretary of the US Treasury. The park is an open-air museum that explores the journey made by the Irish (specifically those from Ulster) to America during the 1800s. The park is used to host events during Easter, Christmas, Fourth of July and Halloween. It also hosts a major Bluegrass festival every year. Over 127,000 people visited the park in 2003.

Strule Arts Centre opened in 2007 is an example of urban renewal in Omagh town centre: a modern civic building, in a newly created public space reclaimed from the formerly disused area, between the River Strule and High Street.

Parks
Omagh has over 20 playgrounds for children, and a large amount of green open area for all the public. The largest of these is the Grange Park, located near the town centre. Many areas around the meanders of the River Strule have also been developed into open areas.

Retail

Omagh is the main retail centre for Tyrone, as well as the West of Ulster (behind Derry and Letterkenny), due to its central location. Shopping areas in Omagh include the Main Street, Great Northern Road Retail Park and the Showgrounds Retail Park on Sedan Avenue in the town centre. Market Street/High Street is also a prominent shopping street, which includes high street stores such as DV8 and Primark.

OASIS Plaza

The 'Omagh Accessible Shared Inclusive Space' (OASIS), a £4.5 million facelift for Omagh's riverbank, was funded by the European Union and planning approved in 2013.

Construction for the project began in March 2014, and the OASIS plaza was officially opened in June 2015.

Transport

Former railways
Neither the town nor the district of Omagh has any railway service.

The Irish gauge  Londonderry and Enniskillen Railway (L&ER) opened as far as Omagh on 3 September 1852 and was extended to Enniskillen in 1854. The Portadown, Dungannon and Omagh Junction Railway (PD&O) reached Omagh in 1861, completing the Portadown – Derry route that came to be informally called "The Derry Road". The Great Northern Railway (Ireland) absorbed the PD&O in 1876 and the L&ER in 1883.

The Government of Northern Ireland made the GNR Board close the Omagh – Enniskillen line in 1957. The Ulster Transport Authority took over the GNR's remaining lines in Northern Ireland in 1958. In accordance with The Benson Report submitted to the Northern Ireland Government in 1963, the UTA closed the "Derry Road" through Omagh on 15 February 1965. Later the Omagh Throughpass road was built on the disused trackbed through Omagh railway station.

Bus services

Bus Services in Omagh are operated by Ulsterbus.

Proposed railways
There are plans to reopen railway lines in Northern Ireland including the line from Portadown via Dungannon to Omagh.

Road connections
 A32 (Omagh – Enniskillen – Ballinamore) (Becomes N87 at border)
 A5 (Northbound) (Omagh – Strabane [and from here north-west to Letterkenny, via Lifford on the A38, becoming the N14 at the county border] – Derry)
 A5 (Southbound) (Omagh – Monaghan – Ashbourne – Dublin) (Becomes N2 at border)
 A4 (Eastbound) (Omagh – Dungannon – Belfast) (A4 joins A5 near Ballygawley)
 A505 (Eastbound) (Omagh – Cookstown)
 The Omagh Throughpass (Stage 3) opened on 18 August 2006.

Education
Omagh has a number of educational institutions at different levels. Omagh was also the headquarters of the Western Education and Library Board (WELB), located at Campsie House on the Hospital Road, before all local education boards in Northern Ireland were combined into the Education Authority in 2015.

Primary schools (elementary schools)
Christ The King Primary School
Gibson Primary School
Gillygooley Primary School
Holy Family Primary School
Omagh County Primary School (and Nursery School)
Omagh Integrated Primary School (and Nursery School)
St Mary's Primary School
St Conor's Primary School
Gaelscoil na gCrann Irish language Primary school (and Naíscoil – Irish language nursery school)
Recarson Primary School – Arvalee

Grammar/secondary school
Christian Brothers Grammar School 
Drumragh Integrated College
Loreto Grammar School
Omagh Academy
Omagh High School
Sacred Heart College

Colleges/universities
Omagh College of Further Education

Lisanelly Shared Educational Campus
The Department for Education proposed to co-locate Omagh's six existing secondary schools on the former 190-acre St Lucia Army Barracks, as one large shared educational campus. In April 2009, at the inaugural Lisanelly Shared Educational Campus Steering Group meeting held in Arvalee School and Resource Centre, the Education Minister, Caitríona Ruane announced that funding had been allocated for exemplar designs and associated technical work for a shared educational campus. The construction was expected to cost in excess of £120 million. As of March 2022, the shared education campus was scheduled to open in 2026.

Religious buildings

The following is a list of religious buildings in Omagh:
Christ the King (Roman Catholic)
Evangelical Presbyterian Church
Gillygooley Presbyterian Church
First Omagh Presbyterian
Independent Methodist
Kingdom Hall of Jehovah's Witnesses
Omagh Baptist
Omagh Community Church (non-denominational)
Omagh Free Presbyterian Church
Omagh Gospel Hall (A company of Christians sometimes referred to as "open brethren")
Omagh Methodist
Sacred Heart (Roman Catholic)
St. Columba's (Church of Ireland)
St. Mary's ( Roman Catholic)
The Church of Jesus Christ of Latter-day Saints (LDS Church)
Trinity Presbyterian Church

Media
In 2014, Omagh became one of only seven Northern Irish towns to receive superfast 4G mobile data coverage from the EE network.

Sport

Gaelic games
The town has two Gaelic football clubs, Omagh St. Enda's, which plays its home games in Healy Park, and Drumragh Sarsfields, which plays its home games at Clanabogan.

Healy Park is the home of Tyrone GAA and the county's largest and main sports stadium located on the Gortin Road, has a capacity nearing 25,000, and had the distinction of being the first Gaelic-games stadium in Ulster to have floodlights.

The stadium now hosts the latter matches of the Tyrone Senior Football Championship, as well as Tyrone's home games, and other inter-county matches that require a neutral venue.

Football
Omagh no longer has a top-flight local football team, since the demise of Omagh Town F.C. in 2005. Strathroy Harps FC are the only Omagh and Tyrone team to win the Irish junior cup twice in 2012 and 2013.

Rugby
Omagh's rugby team, Omagh Academicals (nicknamed the "Accies"), is an amateur team, made up of primarily of local players.

Cricket
Omagh Cavaliers Cricket Club located in Omagh.

Greyhound racing
A greyhound racing track operated from 1932 until 1940. The track was opened by the Duke of Abercorn on 25 May 1932 and racing took place at 'The Park' in the Showgrounds. It was organised by the Tyrone Greyhound Racing Association until 1940.

Notable people
Notable residents or people born in Omagh include:

1800s
 John Meahan (1806–1902) - New Brunswick shipbuilder and politician, born and raised in Omagh
Alice Milligan (1865–1953) - Protestant Nationalist poet
Charles Beattie (1899–1958) – Auctioneer and briefly Member of Parliament

1900s
Jimmy Kennedy (1902–1984) – Songwriter's Hall of Fame-inductee (Red Sails in the Sunset, Teddy Bears Picnic)
Patrick McAlinney (1913–1990) – Actor (The Tomorrow People)
Benedict Kiely (1919–2007) – author (Land Without Stars)
Brian Friel (1929 - 2015) – playwright was born in Knockmoyle near Omagh.
Frankie McBride (b. 1944) – country musician
Arty McGlynn (1944–2019) – International renowned guitarist.
Linda Martin (b. 1947) – musician (Eurovision Song Contest-winner 1992)
Sir Sam Neill (b. 1947) – Jurassic Park actor (born in Omagh)
Gerard McSorley (b. 1950) – actor, films include Veronica Guerin and Omagh
The 6th Duke of Westminster (1951-2016) – peer and major landowner.
Pat Sharkey (b. 1953) – Ipswich Town F.C. and Northern Irish football player in the 1970s.
Willie Anderson (b. 1955) – Ireland Rugby Union International
Philip Turbett (b. 1961) – bassoonist, clarinettist and saxophonist
Aaron McCormack (b. 1971) – company CEO and one of the Young Global Leaders of the World Economic Forum
Ivan Sproule (b. 1981) – current Northern Irish football international and Bristol City F.C. player.
Joe McMahon (b. 1983) – All-Ireland-winning Tyrone Gaelic footballer.
Juliet Turner – singer/songwriter
Phil Taggart (b. 1987) - BBC Radio 1 DJ
Janet Devlin (b. 1994) - X-Factor Finalist 2011 (5th place)
Justin McMahon – All-Ireland-winning Tyrone Gaelic footballer.
Barley Bree - Irish Folk Group
Aoife McArdle - Film Director
Martina Devlin - Journalist and author
Whitey McDonald (b. 1902) - football player Northern Ireland national football team, Rangers F.C. and Bethlehem Steel F.C. (1907–30).  Inductee, Canada Soccer Hall of Fame

Notes

References
 Census 2011

External links

 Omagh Chamber of Commerce & Industry Website
 Omagh Directory 1910
 Flickr group of Omagh photos
 

 
County towns in Northern Ireland
Towns in County Tyrone
Aviation accidents and incidents locations in Northern Ireland